Ali-Morad Khan Zand (died 1785) the fifth Shah of the Zand dynasty of Iran, reigned from March 15, 1781, until February 11, 1785.

Life 
After the death of Karim Khan Zand, Agha Mohammad Khan Qajar who was a hostage—in light of preventing an outbreak of war between the Qajar tribes in the northern Persia and the Zands—escaped promptly and reached Mazandaran. Subsequently, he took command of his tribe in Astrabad, and declared independence from the Zand Shah. Therefore, Zaki Khan Zand dispatched the Persian army under the command of his nephew, Ali Murad Khan against the Qajar lord.

Ali-Morad Khan Zand was given power over the Persian army to destroy rebellious Qajar tribes in the north, but he betrayed Abol-Fath Khan Zand, and left him defenseless in capital to be slain by Sadeq Khan Zand. Ali Morad then captured Isfahan. He levied high taxes on the people and tortured and killed whoever refused. Finally, on March 14, 1781, he captured Shiraz, and killed Sadeq Khan, and sat on the throne. Morad continued the war with Agha Mohammad Khan and raised an army allowing his cousin Rostam to command it. Rostam took this army to the province of Mazandaran where he fought against a Qajar army under the command of Ja'far Qoli Khan. However, Rostam quickly lost the battle and was forced to retreat back to the south.

Ali Murad Khan ruled until 1785 when he was overthrown by Sadiq's son Jafar.

Sources

External links
Rulers of Iran

References

Zand monarchs
Year of birth missing
1785 deaths
Murdered Persian monarchs
Zand generals
18th-century murdered monarchs
1785 murders in Asia